Westmount High School is a public co-educational anglophone secondary school located in Westmount, Quebec, Canada, located near Alexis Nihon Complex Shopping Mall.

Westmount High is Quebec's first and only public school to offer Advanced Placement (AP) courses, because the AP program has been around Westmount High since 2003. They offer AP Calculus, AP Comparative Government and Politics, AP English Literature and Composition, AP Environmental Science, AP French Language and Culture, and AP Psychology.

The school moved to its present location in 1961, after selling their former building to Selwyn House School.

Westmount is part of the English Montreal School Board and was formerly part of the Protestant School Board of Greater Montreal.

Despite being located in one of the wealthiest suburbs of Montreal, the school attracted a diverse mix of students from all neighbourhoods and racial backgrounds. A long-time teacher at the school noted that most wealthy families would send their children to private schools, so the school received mostly students from disadvantaged backgrounds.

Around January 2020, Westmount High School created "The Westmount Highlights," students and vice-principal YouTube channel initiative, in providing students weekly school news, fun facts, and entertainment.

Notable alumni
Mona Elaine Adilman, poet
George Alevisatos, retired CFL player
Jesse Camacho, actor
 John E. Cleghorn, banker, chancellor of Wilfrid Laurier University
 Leonard Cohen, poet, musician, writer
 Stockwell Day, Canadian politician (provincial and federal), former leader of the Canadian Alliance
 Vibert Douglas, astrophysicist
 Kamala Harris, Vice President of the United States, U.S. Senator from California (2017–2021), Attorney General of California (2011–2017), District Attorney of San Francisco (2004–2011)
 Maya Harris, lawyer 
 Jeremy Howick, Oxford philosopher and medical researcher
 Jeffrey Khaner, Principal Flutist, Philadelphia Orchestra, Flute Professor Juilliard School and Curtis Institute
 Mary Jane Lamond, folk musician
 David H. Levy, astronomer, discoverer of 22 comets
 MJ Long, first in class 1956, British architect, OBE, Yale professor.
 Mila Mulroney, wife of former Prime Minister of Canada Brian Mulroney
 Alfred Powis, businessman
Johnny Peirson, professional ice hockey player and colour commentator 
Joanna Pettet actress Walter Winchell AP Oct 4 1962
 Art Ross, professional ice hockey player and executive early 20th century
 Claire Holden Rothman, novelist
 Marla Rubin, stage producer
 Moshe Safdie, class of '55, architect (famous for Montreal's Expo 67's "Habitat 67" apartment complex)
 Norma Shearer, actress
 A. J. M. Smith, poet
 Edgar William Richard Steacie, chemist, president 1952-62 of the National Research Council of Canada
 Caroline Vu, novelist and medical doctor
 Gordon Wasserman, class of '55 Rhodes Scholar Oxford University, appointed member of the UK House of Lords, 2011

References

External links

 Westmount High School
 

English-language schools in Quebec
High schools in Montreal
Educational institutions established in 1873
Schools in Westmount, Quebec
English Montreal School Board
1873 establishments in Quebec